Rosemarie Reichenbach (born 26 April 1935) is a Swiss alpine skier. She competed in the women's downhill at the 1956 Winter Olympics.

References

External links
 

1935 births
Living people
Swiss female alpine skiers
Olympic alpine skiers of Switzerland
Alpine skiers at the 1956 Winter Olympics
People from Gstaad
Sportspeople from the canton of Bern
20th-century Swiss women